Marlyse Hourtou (born 29 July 1996) is a Chadian archer. She competed in the women's individual event at the 2020 Summer Olympics, becoming the first athlete from Chad to contest the Olympic Games in the sport. Hourtou was eliminated in the opening round by South Korea's An San and competed despite her single bow breaking during the course of the Games.

Hourtou also competed in the recurve events at the 2019 African Games in Rabat. Entering the Games with a world ranking of 339, she won two bronze medals in the women's team and mixed team events.

References

External links
 

1996 births
Living people
Chadian female archers
African Games bronze medalists for Chad
African Games medalists in archery
Competitors at the 2019 African Games
Olympic archers of Chad
Archers at the 2020 Summer Olympics
Place of birth missing (living people)